Radić, Radic, Radich, or Radics is a common South Slavic surname.

It is the most common surname in the Split-Dalmatia County in Croatia, and among the most frequent ones in another two counties.

It may refer to:

 Antonio Radić (born 1987), Croatian chess player, host of the agadmator YouTube channel
 Dejan Radić (footballer) (b. 1980), Serbian footballer
 Dejan Radić (volleyball) (b. 1984), Serbian volleyball player
 Gabrijel Radić (b. 1982), Serbian volleyball player
 Gigi Radics (b. 1996), Hungarian pop singer
 Indira Radić (b. 1966), Serbian pop-folk singer
 Jure Radić (priest) (1920–1990), Croatian scientist and priest
 Jure Radić (engineer) (b. 1953), Croatian civil engineer and politician
 Lepa Radić (1925–1943), World War II resistance member, youngest person to receive the Yugoslav Order of the People's Hero
 Marko Radić (b. 1985), Serbian footballer
 Perica Radić (b. 1984), Serbian footballer
 Radivoj Radić (b. 1954), Serbian historian
 Stojan Radic, American engineer
 Stjepan Radić (1871–1928), Croatian politician and founder of the Croatian Peasant Party
 Tomislav Radić (b. 1940), Croatian film director and screenwriter
 Zdravko Radić (b. 1979), Montenegrin water polo player

See also
Radič, South Slavic given name in the Middle Ages
Radović
 Mali Radić, a village in Bosnia
 Veliki Radić, a village in Bosnia

References

Croatian surnames
Serbian surnames
Patronymic surnames